is a railway station on the JR Hokkaido. It is located in Minamifurano, Hokkaido, Japan. Station number is T37. The elevation is 413 metres (AMSL).

Line 
JR Hokkaido
Nemuro Main Line

Station structure
The station has two platforms serving three tracks.

History
The station opened on 3 September 1901.

Surrounding area 
There were Karikachi signal stop, Karikachi tunnel and Niinai Station between this station and Shintoku Station. In 1966 the old line was replaced by new line through Shin-Karikachi tunnel.

Karikachi signal stop
 was located near the west mouth of ( old )Karikachi tunnel. It had zig zag.

Karikachi tunnel
 was 654m long and 534m high (AMSL) at the highest point.

Niinai Station
 was located in the middle of the eastern slope.

Adjacent stations 
Hokkaido Railway Company
Nemuro Main Line
 T36 – Ochiai T37 –  K23

References 

Railway stations in Japan opened in 1901
Railway stations in Hokkaido Prefecture